Rákóczi Bridge (formerly known as Lágymányosi híd / Lágymányosi Bridge) is a bridge in Budapest, Hungary, connecting the settlements of Buda and Pest across the Danube. The construction of the steel girder bridge was started in 1992 to the plans of Tibor Sigrai.

It is named after the Rákóczi family, but is still more usually referred to as Lágymányosi híd. This bridge is the southernmost, and the second newest, public bridge in the capital; it was inaugurated in 1995.

Its Pest end is a station of Csepel HÉV, and the venue of the new Hungarian National Theatre (2002) and the Palace of Arts (2005).

Tramline
The bridge had been designed to accommodate tram lines. The middle of the bridge was left empty for this, but the tracks were not laid out. The Reconstruction of the tram 1 and the bridge passage line section were built together. The bridge was planned to be reconstructed by January 2015, but the opening was delayed, due to the demands of the National Transport Authority. They required one more load test with 1000 tons and after that they opened the extended tram section.

See also
Erzsébet Bridge
Liberty Bridge
Margaret Bridge
Petőfi Bridge
Széchenyi Chain Bridge
Bridges of Budapest
List of crossings of the Danube River

References

External links
 DBridges - Lágymányosi bridge
 Photos of Budapest bridges
 National Theatre
 Palace of Arts
 Bridges of Budapest - Lagymanyosi Bridge

Bridges in Budapest
Bridges completed in 1995
Bridges over the Danube